The 1971 Masters Tournament was the 35th Masters Tournament, held April 8–11 at Augusta National Golf Club in Augusta, Georgia. Charles Coody won his only major championship, two strokes ahead of runners-up Johnny Miller and Jack Nicklaus.

Miller was six-under for the Sunday round and, playing two groups ahead of the final two-some, his birdie on 14 would open up a two-shot lead when Coody subsequently bogeyed the hole, but could not hold on to win. Coody, co-leader with Nicklaus entering the round, rebounded from his bogey at 14 with two consecutive birdies and parred the final two holes while Miller, 23, bogeyed two of the last three holes. It was a bit of redemption for Coody, who bogeyed the final three holes in 1969 to finish two strokes back. It was Coody's third and final win on the PGA Tour.

Future 3-time U.S. Open champion Hale Irwin made his Masters debut in 1971 and tied for 13th place. It was the final Masters for two champions: 1948 winner Claude Harmon, withdrew during the first round and 1955 champion Cary Middlecoff during the second.

Dave Stockton won the twelfth Par 3 contest on Wednesday with a score of 23.

For the first time in its history, the Masters was not the first major championship of the year. The 1971 PGA Championship was played in Florida in February, and was won by Nicklaus. The co-leader entering Sunday, his attempt to secure the second leg of the grand slam came up short on the back nine on Sunday, as he shot 37 for an even-par 72.

Field
1. Masters champions
George Archer, Gay Brewer (9), Billy Casper (2,8,9,11), Doug Ford, Bob Goalby, Ralph Guldahl, Claude Harmon, Herman Keiser, Cary Middlecoff, Jack Nicklaus (2,3,8,10,11), Arnold Palmer (10), Gary Player (3,8), Gene Sarazen, Sam Snead (8), Art Wall Jr.
Jack Burke Jr., Jimmy Demaret, Ben Hogan, Byron Nelson, and Henry Picard did not play.

The following categories only apply to Americans

2. U.S. Open champions (last five years)
Orville Moody (8)

Lee Trevino (9,11) did not play.

3. The Open champions (last five years)

4. PGA champions (last five years)
Julius Boros (8,9), Raymond Floyd (10,11), Al Geiberger, Don January (8), Dave Stockton (8,10)

5. The first eight finishers in the 1970 U.S. Amateur
William C. Campbell (a), Jim Gabrielsen (a), Vinny Giles (7,a), Tom Kite (7,a), Steve Melnyk (6,a), Jim Simons (a), Richard Spears (a), Lanny Wadkins (6,7,a)

6. Previous two U.S. Amateur and Amateur champions

7. Members of the 1970 U.S. Eisenhower Trophy team
Allen Miller (a)

8. Top 24 players and ties from the 1970 Masters Tournament
Tommy Aaron (11), Miller Barber (9,11), Frank Beard (11), Deane Beman, Charles Coe (a), Charles Coody, Bert Greene, Dave Hill (9,11), Howie Johnson (9), Gene Littler (9,10,11), Dick Lotz (10), Bob Lunn (9), Bob Murphy (10), Chi-Chi Rodríguez, Tom Weiskopf, Terry Wilcox, Bert Yancey

9. Top 16 players and ties from the 1970 U.S. Open
Joel Goldstrand, Bobby Mitchell, Ken Still (11), Larry Ziegler

10. Top eight players and ties from 1970 PGA Championship
Larry Hinson

11. Members of the U.S. 1969 Ryder Cup team
Dale Douglass, Dan Sikes

12. One player, either amateur or professional, not already qualified, selected by a ballot of ex-Masters champions.
Homero Blancas

13. Leading eight players, not already qualified, from a points list based on finishes in PGA Tour events since the previous Masters
Dave Eichelberger, Gibby Gilbert, Lou Graham, Jerry Heard, Hale Irwin, Johnny Miller, John Schlee, Tom Shaw

14. Foreign invitations
Bob Charles (8,9), Gary Cowan (5,a), Bruce Crampton (10), Roberto De Vicenzo (3), Bruce Devlin (9), David Graham, Harold Henning, Tommy Horton, Hsieh Yung-yo, Tony Jacklin (2,3,8,9), Takaaki Kono (8), John Lister, Sukree Onsham, Peter Oosterhuis

Numbers in brackets indicate categories that the player would have qualified under had they been American.

Round summaries
First roundThursday, April 8, 1971Source:

Second roundFriday, April 9, 1971Source:

Third roundSaturday, April 10, 1971Source:

Final roundSunday, April 11, 1971''

Final leaderboard

Sources:

Scorecard

Cumulative tournament scores, relative to par

References

External links
Masters.com – past winners and results
Augusta.com – 1971 Masters leaderboard and scorecards

1971
1971 in golf
1971 in American sports
1971 in sports in Georgia (U.S. state)
April 1971 sports events in the United States